Tumor necrosis factor receptor 2 (TNFR2), also known as tumor necrosis factor receptor superfamily member 1B (TNFRSF1B) and CD120b, is one of two membrane receptors that binds tumor necrosis factor-alpha (TNFα). Like its counterpart, tumor necrosis factor receptor 1 (TNFR1), the extracellular region of TNFR2 consists of four cysteine-rich domains which allow for binding to TNFα. TNFR1 and TNFR2 possess different functions when bound to TNFα due to differences in their intracellular structures, such as TNFR2 lacking a death domain (DD).

Function 

The protein encoded by this gene is a member of the tumor necrosis factor receptor superfamily, which also contains TNFRSF1A. This protein and TNF-receptor 1 form a heterocomplex that mediates the recruitment of two anti-apoptotic proteins, c-IAP1 and c-IAP2, which possess E3 ubiquitin ligase activity. The function of IAPs in TNF-receptor signalling is unknown, however, c-IAP1 is thought to potentiate TNF-induced apoptosis by the ubiquitination and degradation of TNF-receptor-associated factor 2 (TRAF2), which mediates anti-apoptotic signals. Knockout studies in mice also suggest a role of this protein in protecting neurons from apoptosis by stimulating antioxidative pathways.

Clinical significance

CNS 

At least partly because TNRF2 has no intracellular death domain, TNFR2 is neuroprotective.

Patients with schizophrenia have increased levels of soluble tumor necrosis factor receptor 2 (sTNFR2).

Cancer 

Targeting of TNRF2 in tumor cells is associated with increased tumor cell death and decreased progression of tumor cell growth.

Increased expression of TNFR2 is found in breast cancer, cervical cancer, colon cancer, and renal cancer. A link between the expression of TNRF2 in tumor cells and late-stage cancer has been discovered. TNFR2 plays a significant role in tumor cell growth as it has been found that the loss of TNFR2 expression is linked with increased death of associated tumor cells and a significant standstill of further growth. There is therapeutic potential in the targeting of TNFR2 for cancer treatments through TNFR2 inhibition.

Systemic Lupus Erythematous (SLE) 

A small scale study of 289 Japanese patients suggested a minor increased predisposition from an amino acid substitution of the 196 allele at exon 6. Genomic testing of 81 SLE patients and 207 healthy patients in a Japanese study showed 37% of SLE patients had a polymorphism on position 196 of exon 6 compared to 18.8% of healthy patients. The TNFR2 196R allele polymorphism suggests that even one 196R allele results in increased risk for SLE.

Interactions 

TNFRSF1B has been shown to interact with:
 TRAF2, and
 TTRAP.

References

Further reading

External links 
 

TNF receptor family